Richmond Kickers Destiny was an American women's soccer team, founded in 2004. The team was a member of the United Soccer Leagues W-League, the second tier of women's soccer in the United States and Canada. The team played in the Atlantic Division of the Eastern Conference. The Richmond Kickers folded the Destiny after the 2009 season in a cost-cutting move.

The team played its home games at Sports Backers Stadium in the city of Richmond, Virginia, and also occasionally at University of Richmond Stadium, and the former First Market Stadium (now known as Robins Stadium). The team's colors were red, white and black.

The team was a sister organization of the men's Richmond Kickers of the USL PRO league, and Richmond Kickers Future, which played in the USL Premier Development League until 2008.

Players

Notable former players
  Chantel Jones
  Nikki Krzysik
  Becky Sauerbrunn

Year-by-year

References

   

Women's soccer clubs in the United States
Richmond Kickers
USL W-League (1995–2015) teams
2004 establishments in Virginia
2009 disestablishments in Virginia
Defunct soccer clubs in Virginia
Association football clubs established in 2004
Association football clubs disestablished in 2009
Women's sports in Virginia